Fussball or Fußball (if the German letter ß is used) may refer to: 
Table football, also known as foosball, a custom-table game loosely based on association football with figures on rods representing the players
The German name for football (or soccer)

See also
Football in Germany
Fuzzball (disambiguation)